Benevolence and the Mandate of Heaven: Transformation of pre-Qin Confucian Classics is a book by a Taiwanese historian Olga Gorodetskaya (Kuo Ching-yun), published in 2010 in Taipei. The book concerns itself with the Confucian philosophical concepts of Benevolence (Ren) and the Mandate of Heaven and their evolution during the period before the establishment of the empire by Qin dynasty.

References

Works about Confucianism
Political science
History books about China
Palaeography
Works about philology